It's All About the Girls is the debut EP by New Found Glory (formerly A New Found Glory) released on December 20, 1997, by Fiddler Records. It is the only release with their original drummer Joe Marino. A re-release, featuring revised cover artwork, was issued by Fiddler in June, 2000.

Track listing
All songs written and composed by New Found Glory

"Shadow" – 2:32
"My Solution" – 3:20
"Scraped Knees" – 3:56
"JB" – 3:56
"Standstill" – 15:17
 includes an untitled hidden track

Personnel
 Jordan Pundik – vocals
 Chad Gilbert – lead guitar
 Steve Klein – rhythm guitar
 Ian Grushka – bass guitar
 Joe Marino – drums, percussion
 Brian "No Regrets" Gilbert – backing vocals

References

1997 debut EPs
New Found Glory EPs
Fiddler Records EPs
Albums produced by Chad Gilbert
Albums produced by James Paul Wisner